Watershed Music Festival is an annual country music festival held at the Gorge Amphitheatre in George, Washington. Produced by Live Nation, the first event was held August 3–5, 2012. Watershed is usually a three day festival. The main attractions of the festival are the multiple stages of live music, featuring a mixture of country music superstars, newcomers and local country performers.

History 

The inaugural festival was produced by Brian O'Connell, president of Live Nation's country division and six-time winner of the Country Music Association award for 'Promoter of the Year'.

When discussing the festival to Billboard Magazine, O'Connell said: "Watershed is an idea that we have been kicking around for a number of years. The Pacific Northwest is a real special place in our country. I've been doing shows up there at the Gorge for years, and Jeff Trisler, my partner at Live Nation and I got to talking about it, and we finally made the call six to eight months ago. I think it will be one of the most unique festivals that we have. We're not trying to be anything more than Watershed. It's going to have its own unique signature. It's got the beauty of the Gorge, and the Columbia River. It's something that can't be duplicated anywhere else."

There was no festival in 2020.

Lineups by year

See also 

List of country music festivals
Country music

References 

Folk festivals in the United States
Festivals in Washington (state)
Music festivals established in 2012
Country music festivals in the United States
Music festivals in Washington (state)